George S. Patton (1885–1945) was a U.S. Army general during World War II.

Patton may also refer to:

Places

United States
Patton, Alabama, a former unincorporated community
Patton, California, an unincorporated community
Patton Township, Ford County, Illinois
Patton, Illinois, an unincorporated community
Patton, Indiana, an unincorporated town
Patton, Missouri, an unincorporated community
Patton, Pennsylvania, a borough
Patton Historic District
Patton Island (disambiguation)
Patton Township, Centre County, Pennsylvania
Patton, West Virginia, an unincorporated community
Patton Park Detroit

Antarctica
Patton Glacier, Ellsworth Mountains, Marie Byrd Land
Patton Bluff, Marie Byrd Land

United Kingdom
Patton, Cumbria, a former parish, now in Whinfell
Patton, Shropshire, a hamlet in Shropshire, England
Patton (hundred), a former hundred of Shropshire, England
Patton Bridge, Cumbria, England

Elsewhere
Patton Seamount, an underwater volcano in the Gulf of Alaska

Military
Patton tank, various U.S. Army tanks
Model 1913 Cavalry Saber or Patton saber
Patton's Additional Continental Regiment, an American Revolutionary War unit

Ships
USC&GS Patton (ASV-80), a survey ship in United States Coast and Geodetic Survey service from 1941 to 1967
USS Patton or HMS Sarawak, a patrol frigate

Other uses
Patton (film), a 1970 film about General George S. Patton
Patton (surname), a surname (and list of people with the name)
Patton State Hospital, psychiatric hospital in San Bernardino, California
Patton Building, Springfield, Massachusetts
Patton Bridge (Auburn, Washington)
Patton Motor Company, a street car manufacturer in Chicago
E. L. Patton Yukon River Bridge, a bridge in Alaska
Patton Drilvosky a character from the Cartoon Network animated series Codename: Kids Next Door

See also
Paton (disambiguation)
Patten (disambiguation)
Patton Oswalt (born 1969), American comedian and actor